Michael Coady (born 1939) is an Irish poet, short story writer, local historian, photographer, genealogist, journalist and "a lapsed trombone player" (his own description), born in Carrick-on-Suir, County Tipperary, Ireland, where he continues to live.

Life
He was educated at University College Galway and University College Cork. He is a former Heimbold Professor of Irish Studies at Villanova University in the United States. His poetry and short stories have been included in many anthologies. Bursaries from the Arts Council have enabled him to travel in the U.S. and Newfoundland and he has held a residency in the Irish Cultural Centre in Paris. He is a member of Aosdána.

His awards include The Patrick Kavanagh Poetry Award in 1979, the Lawrence O’Shaughnessy Award in 2004 and he was a prizewinner in the Francis MacManus competition  for short stories in 1987 and 1993.

Critique of his work
His work is noted for its celebration of place, particularly his home town and the people who live there. It has also been praised for its compassion and for its successful fusion of literary language with the reported demotic of his community. Coady has mined poetic gold from the small, intimate, urban community (surrounded by rural countryside) to which he belongs. His literary strategy follows that of Patrick Kavanagh in celebrating the local and parochial.

Publications

Poetry books
Two for a Woman, Three for a Man (Gallery Press, 1980)
Oven Lane (Gallery Press, 1987)
All Souls (Gallery Press, 1997)
One Another (Gallery Press, 2003)Going by Water (Gallery Press, 2009)

Non FictionThe Well of Spring Water (memoir of the Clare musicians Pakie and Micho Russel, 1996)

EssaysFull Tide - A Miscellany'' (Relay Books, 1999)

Notes and references

External links
Biography Irish Writers Online
Short biography Munster Literature Centre

1939 births
Irish poets
Living people
Aosdána members